Gandozawa Dam  is a gravity dam located in Miyagi Prefecture in Japan. The dam is used for irrigation. The dam impounds about 69  ha of land when full and can store 13480 thousand cubic meters of water. The construction of the dam was started on 1993 and completed in 2009.

See also
List of dams in Japan

References

Dams in Miyagi Prefecture